Watching the English: The Hidden Rules of English Behaviour is a 2004 international bestseller by Kate Fox, a leading social anthropologist. The book examines "typical" English behaviour.

The book was first published in 2004, and updated in 2014.

References

Anthropology books
Books about England
Ethnographic literature